Lincoln County is a county in the U.S. state of South Dakota. As of the 2020 United States Census, the population was 65,161, making it the third-most populated county in the state. Its county seat is Canton. The county was named for Abraham Lincoln, 16th President of the United States.

Lincoln County is included in the Sioux Falls, SD, Metropolitan Statistical Area.

It is one of the top 10 fastest-growing counties in the United States in terms of rate of population increase, rate of housing unit increase, and many other factors. This is due to the southward growth of Sioux Falls, and the expansion of its suburbs.

Geography
The Big Sioux River flows south-southeastward along the east line of Lincoln County. Lincoln County is on the eastern line of South Dakota. Its east boundary line abuts the west boundary line of the state of Iowa (across the river).

The county terrain consists of low rolling hills. The county area is largely devoted to agriculture. The terrain slopes to the southeast, and drops off to the river valley along its east edge.

Lakes
 Lake Alvin
 Lake Lakota

Protected areas

 Atkins Waterfowl Production Area
 Fish State Game Production Area
 Good Earth State Park
 Johnson State Game Production Area
 Klondike State Game Production Area
 Lake Alvin State Game Production Area
 Lake Alvin State Recreation Area
 McKee State Game Production Area
 Newton Hills State Park
 Nine Mile Creek State Game Production Area
 Oak Ridge State Game Production Area
 Pattee Lake State Game Production Area
 Rolling State Game Production Area
 Watershed Lake State Game Production Area
 Worthing State Game Production Area

Major highways

 Interstate 29
 Interstate 229
 U.S. Highway 18
 South Dakota Highway 11
 South Dakota Highway 17
 South Dakota Highway 44
 South Dakota Highway 46
 South Dakota Highway 115

Adjacent counties

 Minnehaha County – north
 Lyon County, Iowa – northeast
 Sioux County, Iowa – southeast
 Union County – south
 Clay County – southwest
 Turner County – west

Demographics

2000 census
As of the 2000 United States Census, there were 24,131 people, 8,782 households, and 6,665 families in the county. The population density was 42 people per square mile (16/km2). There were 9,131 housing units at an average density of 16 per square mile (6/km2). The racial makeup of the county was 97.55% White, 0.34% Black or African American, 0.53% Native American, 0.46% Asian, 0.02% Pacific Islander, 0.29% from other races, and 0.81% from two or more races. 0.70% of the population were Hispanic or Latino of any race.

There were 8,782 households, out of which 41.00% had children under the age of 18 living with them, 66.50% were married couples living together, 6.70% had a female householder with no husband present, and 24.10% were non-families. 19.50% of all households were made up of individuals, and 8.00% had someone living alone who was 65 years of age or older. The average household size was 2.72 and the average family size was 3.14.

The county population contained 29.70% under the age of 18, 7.60% from 18 to 24, 31.90% from 25 to 44, 20.40% from 45 to 64, and 10.40% who were 65 years of age or older. The median age was 34 years. For every 100 females, there were 99.80 males. For every 100 females age 18 and over, there were 97.50 males.

The median income for a household in the county was $48,338, and the median income for a family was $55,401. Males had a median income of $34,486 versus $24,133 for females. The per capita income for the county was $22,304. About 3.20% of families and 4.40% of the population were below the poverty line, including 4.70% of those under age 18 and 7.80% of those age 65 or over.

2010 census
As of the 2010 United States Census, there were 44,828 people, 16,649 households, and 12,287 families in the county. The racial makeup of the county was 96.1% white, 1.0% Asian, 0.7% black or African American, 0.5% American Indian, 0.3% from other races, and 1.4% from two or more races. Those of Hispanic or Latino origin made up 1.2% of the population. In terms of ancestry, 47.1% were German, 20.9% were Norwegian, 11.7% were Irish, 7.2% were Dutch, 5.2% were English, and 3.9% were American.

Of the 16,649 households, 41.0% had children under the age of 18 living with them, 63.3% were married couples living together, 7.3% had a female householder with no husband present, 26.2% were non-families, and 20.2% of all households were made up of individuals. The average household size was 2.68 and the average family size was 3.11. The median age was 32.8 years.

The median income for a household in the county was $67,365 and the median income for a family was $75,231. Males had a median income of $43,537 versus $34,715 for females. The per capita income for the county was $33,261. About 2.7% of families and 4.3% of the population were below the poverty line, including 4.9% of those under age 18 and 7.5% of those age 65 or over.

Communities

Cities

 Beresford (partial)
 Canton (county seat)
 Harrisburg
 Lennox
 Sioux Falls (partial)
 Tea
 Worthing

Towns
 Fairview
 Hudson

Census-designated place
 Shindler

Unincorporated communities
 Naomi (partial)
 Norway Center

Townships

Brooklyn
Canton
Dayton
Delapre
Delaware
Eden
Grant
Fairview
Highland
La Valley
Lincoln
Lynn
Norway
Perry
Pleasant
Springdale

Politics
Lincoln County voters have been reliably Republican for decades. In no national election since 1964 has the county selected a Democratic Party candidate.

See also

 National Register of Historic Places listings in Lincoln County, South Dakota

References

External links

 Lincoln County, SD government website

 
Sioux Falls, South Dakota metropolitan area
1867 establishments in Dakota Territory
Populated places established in 1867